{{DISPLAYTITLE:C22H29NO5}}
The molecular formula C22H29NO5 may refer to:

 Eugenodilol
 Trimebutine